= Lhasa Half Marathon =

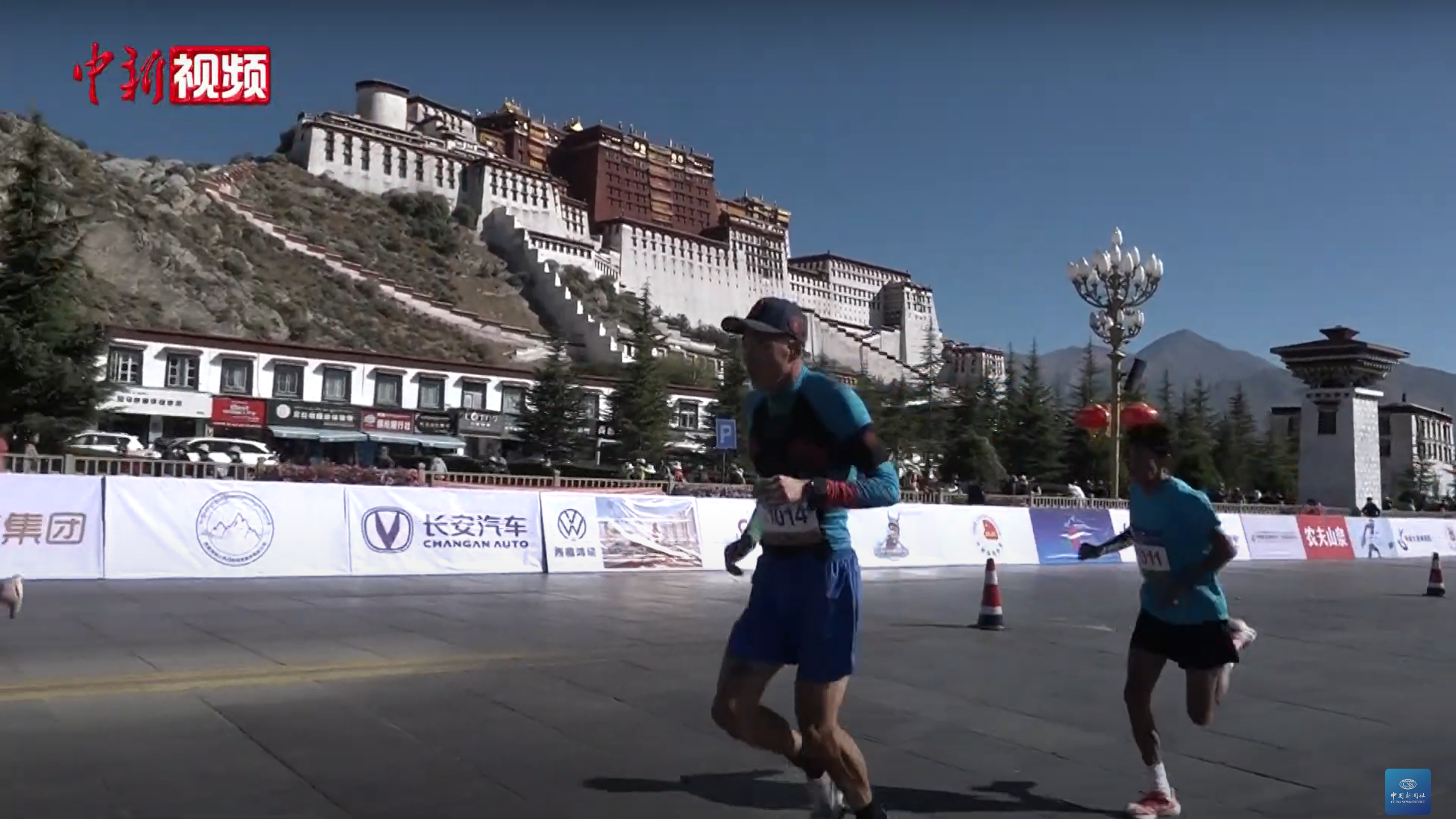
Lhasa Half Marathon in October 2021

Lhasa Half Marathon (Chinese: 拉萨半程马拉松), is the highest half marathon in China, at an elevation of about 3,650 meters, is located in Lhasa, the capital of Tibet Autonomous Region, China. The race has three categories: half marathon, quarter marathon and mini marathon.

== History ==
The 2018 Lhasa Half Marathon was grueling on November 11, 2018, with Dobuje winning the men's race with a record of 1:11:35; and Tsering Tsom winning the women's race with 1:23:20.

The Tibet Lhasa Half Marathon was held for the second time in 2021, with 3,000 marathon enthusiasts from all over China gathering in Lhasa. After the competition, Solang Tsering and Tsering Tsom were the winners of the half-marathon men's and women's divisions.

The 2023 Lhasa Marathon was held on August 27, 2023, featuring 4,000 runners, with Sonam Tsering taking first place for the men (1:10:3) and Tsering Tsomo taking first place for the women (1:23:48), both from Tibet.
